A crankshaft is the part of an engine which translates reciprocating linear piston motion into rotation.

Crankshaft can also mean:

 Crankshaft (comic strip), a comic strip by Tom Batiuk
 Crankshaft (JavaScript), name for compilation technology in the V8 JavaScript engine by Google
 Douglas Murray (ice hockey), an ice hockey player nicknamed "Crankshaft"

See also